

The DFW R.III was a German bomber aircraft designed during World War I, but which had not yet been built when the end of the war led to the project's cancellation. Conceptually similar to DFW's preceding R.I and R.II designs, the R.III was to have been a much larger aircraft, powered by eight engines. As with the previous designs, these were to be housed inside the fuselage, driving propellers by long driveshafts. In the R.III design, however, these propellers were to be mounted on a nacelle in the interplane gap. Each end of this nacelle would carry two co-axial propellers, each driven by a separate engine. Had it been built, the R.III would have been the largest aircraft in the world at the time.

Specifications (as designed)

References

 The German Giants, The Story of the R-planes 1914-1919, G.W. Haddow & Peter M. Grosz, Putnam & Company Limited, 42 Great Russell Street, London,  First Published July 1962

External links
 "The German D.F.W. Commercial Four-Engined Biplane" Flight 25 September 1919, vol. XI, no. 39, pp. 1274–78. The R.III is described and illustrated on pp. 1276–77.

1910s German bomber aircraft
R.III